The Circus of Nero or Circus of Caligula was a circus in ancient Rome, located mostly in the present-day Vatican City.

Location and dimensions
The accompanying plan shows an early interpretation of the relative locations of the circus and the medieval and current St. Peter's Basilica. The plan also suggests the dimensions of the circus relative to the Basilicas. A more modern interpretation differs in various respects: it maintains the central obelisk in the same position relative to the Basilicas, as in the accompanying plan, but rotates the entire circus about the obelisk, in a clockwise direction, about 170 degrees, so that the starting gates of the circus are now towards the east, and closer to the centre of Rome. The more modern interpretation also shows the circus as being much longer, relative to its width as compared to the early interpretation. See plan: "Outline of St. Peter's, Old St. Peter's, and Circus of Nero".

In both interpretations the circus building is centred on the obelisk; is aligned on a similar east–west line to that of the Basilicas; and lies to the south of the axis of the current Basilica (to the left looking at the western front from the piazza). The major differences are in the relocation of the starting gates to the eastern end, and the change in proportions of the circus itself.

Construction
It was begun by Caligula on the property of his mother Agrippina on the Ager Vaticanus (today's rione of Borgo), and finished by Claudius.

Nearby Roman cemetery

The Via Cornelia ran parallel with the north side of the Circus, and its course can be traced with precision, for pagan tombs have been discovered at various times along its edges. Sante Bartoli's memoirs record that when Alexander VII was building the left wing of Bernini's colonnade and the lefthand fountain, a tomb was discovered with a bas-relief above the door representing a marriage-scene ("vi era un bellissimo bassorilievo di un matrimonio antico"). Others were soon found. The best discovery, that of pagan tombs exactly on the line of St Peter's tomb, was made in the presence of Grimaldi, 9 November 1616:
On that day, I entered a square sepulchral room the ceiling of which was ornamented with designs in painted stucco. There was a medallion in the centre, with a figure in high relief. The door opened on the Via Cornelia, which was on the same level. This tomb is located under the seventh step in front of the middle door of the church. I am told that the sarcophagus now used as a fountain, in the court of the Swiss Guards, was discovered at the time of Gregory XIII in the same place, and that it contained the body of a pagan.

Place of martyrdom

The circus was the site of the first organized, state-sponsored martyrdoms of Christians in 65 AD. Tradition holds that two years later, Saint Peter and many other Christians shared their fate. The circumstances were described in detail by Tacitus in a well-known passage of the Annals (xv.44).

The site for crucifixions in the Circus would have been along the spina ("spine"), as suggested by the 2nd century Acts of Peter describing the spot of his martyrdom as inter duas metas ("between the two metae or turning-posts", which would have been equidistant between the two ends of the circus). However, the existing Latin manuscript of the Acts of Peter belongs to the 6th-7th century and is believed to be a 4th-5th century translation of the original Greek. The Greek text has survived in 9th century and later manuscripts only, which does not allow to determine the exact date of this description precisely. The obelisk at the centre of this circus's spina always remained standing, until it was re-erected in Saint Peter's Square in the 16th century by the architect Domenico Fontana. The obelisk was originally brought to Rome by Caligula.

The traditional location of Saint Peter's tomb is in this area, in the cemetery mentioned above and on a site suggested by the basilica (see below).

Constantine's basilica

A basilica (Old St. Peter's) was erected by Constantine over the site, using some of the existing structure of the Circus of Nero. The basilica was sited so that its apse was centered on Peter's tomb (now beneath the high altar of the current St Peter's Basilica). The circus itself was already abandoned by the middle of the second century AD, when the area was partitioned and given in concession to private individuals for the construction of tombs belonging to the necropolis. However it seems most of the ruins of the Circus survived until 1450, when they were finally destroyed by the construction of the new St. Peter's Basilica.

See also
Circus Maximus
Index of Vatican City-related articles

References

External links
stpetersbasilica.info - Largest online source of information on St. Peter's Basilica and Square in the Vatican City.
Lacus Curtius website: Circus of Nero, plan superposed with the Basilicas, showing the tomb of Peter, and text by Rodolfo Lanciani describing the largely inadvertent archaeology.

Buildings and structures completed in the 1st century
Buildings and structures demolished in the 15th century
Nero
Former buildings and structures in Italy
Caligula
Nero
1st-century establishments in Italy
15th-century disestablishments in Italy